Chopper Chicks In Zombietown, (formerly known as Chrome Hearts) is a 1989 American comedy horror film written and directed by Dan Hoskins.  It was released by Troma and features early roles by Billy Bob Thornton and Hal Sparks before they became famous.  Former MTV veejay Martha Quinn also appears.

Plot 
The film is about an all-female motorcycle gang named the "Cycle Sluts", who cruise into the isolated town of Zariah looking for a good time. Here, an evil scientist-turned-mortician has been killing local townspeople with the aid of his long-suffering dwarf assistant and turning them into zombies to use as labor at an abandoned mine. The mine is too radioactive after underground nuclear testing to be mined by living people. Although the scientist later admits that the real reason he has been doing it is not the money, but because he is just plain mean.

The zombies escape after a curious little boy removes the lock to explore the mine, becoming the zombies' first victim. Around this point, a bus-load of blind orphans become stranded just on the outskirts of town as their ride breaks down. Luckily their bus-driver always keeps an Uzi on the bus "for sentimental reasons".

With vague memories of life to guide them, the zombies eventually find their way back to town and begin devouring live flesh. Going against the wishes of their leader and despite some rough treatment from the locals earlier in the film, the Cycle Sluts ride to the rescue and begin killing the zombies using chainsaws, baseball bats, welding torches, a garrote and a staple gun.

In the final scene, the Cycle Sluts use fresh meat to lure the remaining zombies to the town church, which they have packed with dynamite. They are now aided by the doctor's dwarf who has decided that there are better lines of work than being a henchman. With all the undead inside and the church sealed up, the timer goes off and the church goes up in flames, zombies and all. The Cycle Sluts are rewarded with a sack full of cash and induct the dwarf and several of the blind orphans as honorary Cycle Sluts. They then ride out of town with some of the men folk in tow (their new "bitches") and throw the sack of money to the wind.

Cast 
 Jamie Rose as Dede
 Catherine Carlen as Rox
 Lycia Naff as T. C.
 Vicki Frederick as Jewel
 Kristina Loggia as Jojo
 Gretchen Palmer as Rusty
 Martha Quinn as Mae Clutter
 Don Calfa as Ralph Willum
 Billy Bob Thornton as Donny
 Hal Sparks as Lance
  Ed Gale as Bob Littleton
  David Dohrmann as Kenny

Reception 
Variety called it "a surprisingly funny B-movie spoof with a feminist edge."  Stephen Holden of The New York Times wrote, "Although Mr. Hoskins's screenplay has a few amusing jokes, the movie is seriously deficient in visual and verbal energy."  Kevin Thomas of the Los Angeles Times wrote, "It's a deliciously trashy title, and thankfully it's not been wasted: This is a diverting piece of deliberate schlock with a healthy share of laughs that's just right for midnight-movie fare."  Writing in The Zombie Movie Encyclopedia, academic Peter Dendle said that though the film has funny moments, it is overall "forced and overdone".

References

External links 
 
 
 

1989 films
1989 horror films
American comedy horror films
American independent films
American zombie comedy films
Outlaw biker films
Troma Entertainment films
1980s English-language films
1980s American films